Alfonso Pacella (also Alfonso Pacelli) (1674–1702) was a Roman Catholic prelate who served as Bishop of Muro Lucano (1674–1702).

Biography
Francesco Maria Annoni was born in Balvano, Italy on 6 Nov 1630 and ordained a priest on 17 Aug 1664.
On 1 Oct 1674, he was appointed during the papacy of Pope Clement X as Bishop of Muro Lucano. On 7 Oct 1674, he was consecrated bishop in Rome by Gasparo Carpegna, Cardinal-Priest of San Silvestro in Capite. 
He served as Bishop of Muro Lucano until his death on 31 Dec 1702.

See also 
Catholic Church in Italy

References

External links and additional sources
 (for Chronology of Bishops) 
 (for Chronology of Bishops) 

17th-century Italian Roman Catholic bishops
18th-century Italian Roman Catholic bishops
Bishops appointed by Pope Clement X
1630 births
1702 deaths